The black imperial pigeon (Ducula melanochroa), also known as the Bismarck imperial pigeon, is a species of bird in the family Columbidae. It is endemic to the Bismarck Archipelago where it lives in forests.

Taxonomy and systematics 
The black imperial pigeon was originally described as Carpophaga melanochroa by Philip Sclater in 1878 based on specimens from the Duke of York Islands. The generic name Ducula is from "dukul", the Nepali name for imperial pigeons. The specific name melanochroa is from the Ancient Greek word melanokhrōs, meaning black-skinned. Black imperial pigeon is the official common name designated by the International Ornithologists' Union. Other common names for the species include black imperial-pigeon, Bismarck imperial pigeon, Bismarck imperial-pigeon, and silver-laced imperial pigeon.

The black imperial pigeon is often placed in a species group with the Pinon's, Louisiade, and collared imperial pigeons. It has no subspecies.

Description 
Both sexes are similar. It is mainly slaty-black, with silver fringes on the wing coverts (flight feathers) and back that make a scaled pattern. The undertail coverts are dark chestnut while the underside of the tail is grey. The iris is red, the bill is blue-grey with a black tip, and the feet are dark reddish. Juveniles are similar to adults, but have paler chestnut on the undertail coverts.

Nicobar pigeons in flight may be confused with black imperial pigeons, but have longer wings, a shorter tail, and a longer, thinner-necked appearance.

Vocalisations 
The black imperial pigeon makes a series of three low-pitched booming notes, along with grunts and a hornbill-like arh. A very deep mmmmmmmmmmmmmmm has also been reported from New Ireland.

Distribution and habitat 
The black imperial pigeon is endemic to the Bismarck Archipelago, where it is found on the islands of Umboi, New Britain, Watom, Duke of York, and New Ireland. It mainly inhabits forests in hills and mountains, but is also seasonally found in lowland forest on New Britain.

Behaviour and ecology

Diet 
Foraging occurs in the canopy and is most often done alone or in small flocks, although flocks with as many as 40 birds may be seen on Ficus trees.

Breeding 
It contained a single white egg.

Status 
The black imperial pigeon is listed as being of least concern by the International Union for Conservation of Nature (IUCN) on the IUCN Red List due to a sufficiently large range and lack of sufficient population decline. However, its population is thought to be declining due to habitat destruction.

References

black imperial pigeon
Birds of the Bismarck Archipelago
black imperial pigeon
black imperial pigeon
Taxonomy articles created by Polbot